"I've Got You" is a song by English actress and singer Martine McCutcheon. It was written by Tony Moran, Kara DioGuardi, Tony Coluccio, and Jon Wolfson and was included on McCutcheon's debut studio album, You Me & Us (1999). Produced by Moran, "I've Got You" was released as the second single from the album, after "Perfect Moment", on 30 August 1999. The song afforded McCutcheon another top-10 hit in the UK, peaking at number six on the UK Singles Chart, and also reached number 17 on the Irish Singles Chart.

Release and reception
"I've Got You" received a boost in airplay on UK radio in early August 1999, and on 30 August, it was officially released as a single across three formats: two CD singles and a cassette single. Critically, British trade publication Music Week wrote that the song was not as good as Martine McCutcheon's previous single, "Perfect Moment", but noted its strong chorus. British columnist James Masterton wrote that the track's chorus would "sound perfect on a Sheryl Crow b-side" but doubted the song's ability to appeal to a wide audience.

On the week beginning 4 September 1999, "I've Got You" debuted at its peak of number six on the UK Singles Chart, giving McCutcheon her second top-10 hit in the UK, after "Perfect Moment". The song spent a total of 12 weeks in the UK top 100, making it her third-longest stay on the chart. In Ireland, the single debuted on the Irish Singles Chart on 2 September 1999 and peaked at number 17, becoming McCutcheon's second of three top-20 hits on this chart, and remained in the top 30 for six weeks. With its combined British and Irish sales, "I've Got You" debuted at number 30, its peak, on the Eurochart Hot 100 in mid-September and remained on the listing for five weeks, making its last appearance on 16 October 1999.

Track listings
UK CD1 and cassette single
 "I've Got You" – 3:42
 "Never Lose Your Faith in Love" – 3:06
 "Hold Me Tighter in the Rain" – 3:16

UK CD2
 "I've Got You" – 3:42
 "I've Got You" (instrumental) – 3:42
 "Perfect Moment" (instrumental) – 3:49
 "I've Got You" (video)

Credits and personnel
Credits are lifted from the UK CD1 liner notes and the You Me & Us album booklet.

Studios
 Recorded at mixed at Sound Barrier Studios (New York City)
 Strings recorded at Angel Studios (London, England)
 Mastered at Metropolis Studios (London, England)

Personnel

 Tony Moran – writing, production, arrangement
 Kara DioGuardi – writing
 Tony Coluccio – writing, keyboards, keyboard programming, Pro Tools
 Jon Wolfson – writing
 Bernd Schoenhart – guitar, bass
 Duke Mushroom – percussion
 Dave Saronson – recording, mixing, engineering
 Jason Hazeley – string arrangement, conducting
 Niall Acott – string engineering
 Tom Jenkins – assistant string engineering
 Jeff Damo – assistant engineering
 Tom Chianti – assistant engineering
 Giuseppe D – Pro Tools
 Mark Rubenstein – Pro Tools
 Tim Young – mastering
 Joe Pearson – artwork design
 Paul Cox – photography

Charts

References

1999 singles
1999 songs
Innocent Records singles
Martine McCutcheon songs
Songs written by Kara DioGuardi
Songs written by Tony Moran
Virgin Records singles